Caleb Jeffrey Hanie (born September 11, 1985) is a former American football quarterback. He played college football at Colorado State and was signed by the Chicago Bears as an undrafted free agent in 2008. He also played for the Denver Broncos and Cleveland Browns.

Early years
Hanie played high school football for Forney High School in Forney, Texas and led his team to consecutive top 3 finishes in class 3A in 2002 and 2003.

College career
Hanie was the starting quarterback for the Colorado State Rams in 2006 and 2007.

Professional career

Chicago Bears
Hanie was signed by the Chicago Bears as a free agent following the 2008 NFL Draft on April 28, 2008.  He made the Bears' 53-man roster prior to the start of the 2008 season.

He made his first regular season contribution as a Bear towards the end of their blowout loss to the Cincinnati Bengals on October 25, 2009. He completed one of two passes for two yards. He went on to make another appearance against the Baltimore Ravens on December 20, 2009, completing two of five passes for eight yards. During that game, he also threw his first career interception on an acrobatic play by Domonique Foxworth. On October 3, 2010 Bears starter Jay Cutler and backup Todd Collins both suffered injuries in a game against the New York Giants, and Hanie entered the game as the third quarterback. He went three of four for 36 yards, but the Bears still suffered their first loss of the 2010 season. On October 10, 2010, with Cutler on the bench due to a concussion suffered the previous week, Collins started the game but proved ineffective, throwing four interceptions.  Hanie entered the game in the third quarter and went 2-3 for 19 yards. The Bears won the game 23-6, primarily on points scored in the early part of the first quarter, and scored two fourth-quarter field goals on drives led by Hanie.

2010 NFC Championship Game
Hanie entered the 2010 NFC Championship Game as the third-string quarterback in the third quarter after starter Jay Cutler left with a second-degree sprain of his MCL and second-string quarterback Todd Collins left with a shoulder injury. He led the Bears to a touchdown in his first series on the field but was later intercepted by defensive lineman B. J. Raji, who returned the interception for a touchdown. On the following drive, Hanie led the Bears to a second touchdown in only 81 seconds of game time. He later threw another interception, this time to Sam Shields, with 37 seconds left in the game. Overall, Hanie completed 13 passes in 20 attempts for 153 yards and a touchdown with two interceptions. The Bears lost to the Packers 21–14.

2011 season

After a back-and-forth preseason, Hanie won a battle with Nate Enderle for the second position on the depth chart. Against the San Diego Chargers in week 11, starting quarterback Jay Cutler suffered a broken thumb on his throwing hand. The following day, the Bears reported that Cutler would need surgery on the thumb, possibly ending his season. Hanie was named the starter for the Bears until Cutler's return.

On November 27, 2011 Hanie started his first NFL game against the Oakland Raiders. He threw two touchdowns and three interceptions in the 25–20 loss, snapping the Bears' five-game winning streak. Hanie became the first quarterback since 1983 to throw a postseason touchdown before a regular season touchdown. In that game, however, with 8 seconds left, looking to spike the ball, Hanie stepped backwards, as if attempting a pass, and then spiked the ball. He was charged with intentional grounding and was forced to runoff the clock 10 more seconds, preserving a Raiders win. The following week, Hanie threw three interceptions in a 10–3 loss to the Kansas City Chiefs. The Bears eventually lost in overtime to the Denver Broncos 13–10. After getting swept against the Seattle Seahawks 38–14, Hanie was replaced by Josh McCown for Week 16 against the Packers and Minnesota Vikings in Week 17.

The Bears stated that they would not re-sign Hanie for 2012.

Denver Broncos
Hanie signed with the Denver Broncos on March 24, 2012. In the 2012 preseason, Hanie and newly acquired quarterback Peyton Manning faced Hanie's former team in the Bears in Week 1 of the preseason. During the game, though Hanie was sacked three times by Shea McClellin, Cheta Ozougwu, and Nate Collins, Hanie completed 7/14 passes for 79 yards and a 67.3 passer rating, en route to a 31-3 victory.

Baltimore Ravens
Hanie signed a one-year contract with the Baltimore Ravens on April 16, 2013 as competition for Tyrod Taylor for the backup quarterback position. He was released on August 30, 2013.

Cleveland Browns
Hanie was signed by the Cleveland Browns on December 3, 2013. However, he was waived on December 10.

Dallas Cowboys
Hanie was signed to a one-year deal by the Dallas Cowboys on April 23, 2014. Hanie was released by the team on August 26, 2014.

NFL career statistics

Regular season

Playoffs

References

External links

Chicago Bears bio 
Colorado State Rams bio 

1985 births
Living people
People from Forney, Texas
Players of American football from Dallas
American football quarterbacks
Colorado State Rams football players
Chicago Bears players
Denver Broncos players
Baltimore Ravens players
Cleveland Browns players
Dallas Cowboys players